The Spell is the second studio album by Danish band Alphabeat. It was released on 26 October 2009 by Copenhagen Records. Alphabeat stated their second album would be a departure from the pop roots of their debut studio album, Alphabeat (2007), in favour of dance acts from the 1990s such as Snap! and Black Box, with band member Anders SG saying the title track was particularly inspired by Black Box's 1990 song "I Don't Know Anybody Else".

The album was originally set to be released in the United Kingdom one week after the original Danish release, but was eventually released on 1 March 2010, followed by the second single, "Hole in My Heart". For its international release, the album was retitled The Beat Is... and includes the bonus track "Till I Get Round".

In November 2010, the album earned Alphabeat the Danish Music Award for Danish Group of the Year.

Singles
"The Spell" was released in Denmark on 21 September 2009, serving as the lead single from the album. It topped the Danish Singles Chart for four non-consecutive weeks, while reaching number six in Belgium, number 11 in the Netherlands and number 20 in the United Kingdom.

"Hole in My Heart" was released on 21 February 2010 as the album's second UK single and third single overall, peaking at 29 on the UK Singles Chart.

"DJ", released on 9 January 2010 as the album's second single in Denmark, peaked at number six on the Danish chart. When released as the third UK single on 31 May 2010, the track was remixed by Biffco and issued as "DJ (I Could Be Dancing)", but failed to chart within the UK top 100, instead reaching number 116.

"Heat Wave" was released in Denmark on 21 June 2010 as the album's fourth and final single overall. It charted at number four in Denmark, the group's second highest-peaking single in their home country.

Critical reception

The Beat Is... received mixed reviews from music critics. At Metacritic, which assigns a normalised rating out of 100 to reviews from mainstream publications, the album received an average score of 58, based on seven reviews. K. Ross Hoffman of AllMusic viewed the album as "an even glossier, more unabashedly poptastic affair than their first album", adding that it "takes its cues from turn of the '90s club music: Hi-NRG, Euro-beat, hip-house, and the Scandinavian synth-reggae of Ace of Base." Hugh Montgomery wrote for The Observer that the album finds the group "appropriating the handbag house sound that was the cornerstone of provincial clubs circa 1995. Thus jittery piano riffs and hands-in-the-air breakdowns abound, while singer Stine hollers dancefloor doggerel." Simon Gage of the Daily Express described the songs as "chirpy and silly with witty lyrics", while calling the music itself "Euro-nonsense at its finest". Stephen Kelly of NME commented that Alphabeat "have bravely stripped away all the bubblegum that originally made them popular in favour of the Euro-dance years of the late-'80s/early-'90s. The result is stronger than you might think, but too inconsistent and devoid of depth to stand out on a battlefield where Gaga rules all."

The Times critic Peter Paphides opined that the album "varies the tempo and tone without sacrificing the joyful execution. The ultra-catchy single, 'The Spell', is an apt microcosm of a whole that peaks with the Italo-house urgency of '365 Degrees'. But, if 'Chess' resemblance to Ace of Base strikes you as a bad thing, the rest may not appeal to you either." Michael Cragg of musicOMH noted that "[t]hings start promisingly, [...] with the first four songs zipping by in a blaze of joyfully cheesy beats [...], '90s rave piano [...] and neat vocal interplay between singers Anders SG and Stine Bramsen", but felt that the remainder of the album "lacks any sparkle or panache, with the band falling foul of a very current musical disease; the Auto-Tune obsession." Lauren Murphy of entertainment.ie concluded that the group "may have lost some of their magic, but they admittedly make reparations with the damned catchy 'Heat Wave' and 'The Right Thing', two of the peppiest tunes on offer here. Unfortunately, it's not quite enough to prevent this album from being something of an anticlimax. A highly stylised one, sure—but a disappointment, nonetheless." The Guardians Michael Hann expressed, "The glee that infused that first album has been swamped by endless staccato synth or piano riffs, all of which sound like a score of minor hits from a generation ago." Aaron Lavery of Drowned in Sound panned the album as "an absolute abomination of a record" and stated, "Gone is any sense of personality or charm that Alphabeat once had, to be replaced by masses of Autotuned vocals, processed beats and batteries of keyboard sounds that haven't been aired since Ace of Base and 2Unlimited ruled the waves."

Track listing

Personnel
Credits adapted from the liner notes of The Beat Is...

Alphabeat
 Anders B – production 
 Troels Hansen – production 
 Rasmus Nagel – production 
 Anders SG – production 

Additional personnel

 Miles Aldridge – photography
 Chris Gehringer – mastering
 Serban Ghenea – mixing
 Mr & Mrs Smith – logo design
 Hannah Neaves – product management
 Liz Pagett – management
 Jonas Quant – keyboards, production, programming 

 Torben Ravn – product management
 Salvador Design – layout design
 Jakob Sørensen – product management
 Mike Spencer – production 
 Richard "Biff" Stannard – keyboards, production, programming

Charts

Weekly charts

Year-end charts

Certifications

Release history

References

2009 albums
Alphabeat albums
Fascination Records albums
Albums produced by Richard Stannard (songwriter)